Hello, Blue Roses is a Canadian musical collaboration involving Sydney Hermant, a visual artist from Vancouver, and her boyfriend Dan Bejar (of Destroyer and The New Pornographers).

History
Hello, Blue Roses was created by Hermant and Bejar in 2008. Their name is a reference to a line from Tennessee William's The Glass Menagerie. They released their debut album, The Portrait Is Finished and I Have Failed to Capture Your Beauty..., in 2008 through by Locust Music.

In February, 2015 the pair released a second album, WZO, through JAZ Records. Most of the songs were written by Hermant. It was distributed as both a digital download and limited-edition vinyl LP.

Discography

"The Portrait Is Finished and I Have Failed to Capture Your Beauty..." Track listing

"WZO" Track listing

References

External links
CBC Radio 3 Podcast No. 142

Musical groups established in 2008
Musical groups from Vancouver
Canadian indie pop groups
2008 establishments in British Columbia
Locust Music artists